The United States Association of Reptile Keepers (USARK) is a 501(c)(6) nonprofit organization. USARK describes itself as "a science, education and conservation based advocacy (organization) for the responsible private ownership of, and trade in reptiles."

Founding
USARK was founded by Andrew Wyatt in 2008 to protect reptile keepers and breeders from an increasingly restrictive regulatory environment. The co-founders of USARK included Jeff Ronne, Warren Booth, Shawn Heflick, Brian Sharp, Dan and Colette Sutherland, Mack Robinette, Lou Sangermano, Ralph Davis, Doug Price, and Sherry Tregembo. This group would become the USARK Board of Directors, and Andrew Wyatt would become the President and CEO.

USARK is credited with pioneering advocacy for herpetoculture (the keeping and propagation under human care of reptiles and amphibians). In the early years, USARK developed a large grassroots component known as the "Reptile Nation." Today it is estimated that the reptile industry generates roughly $1.2 billion in annual revenues.

In February 2013, Phil Goss was appointed president of USARK.

President Phil Goss stated in an interview that every American should have the right to own any reptile, but not every person should own one. "Be prepared and willing to accept the responsibilities of any reptile you buy for his entire life."

Lobbying
USARK has done extensive lobbying of proposed legislation that affects species within its mandate.

In June, 2014, USARK lobbied the United States Fish and Wildlife Service opposing the listing of five species of snakes (Boa constrictor, Reticulated python, DeSchauensee's anaconda, Green anaconda and Beni anaconda) as injurious under the Lacey Act. Listing the species was said to result in a ban of interstate transportation/commerce and importation; essentially resulting in the species vanishing from the pet community.

Position statements
On conservation, USARK recommends approaches to maintaining the biodiversity of reptiles and amphibians that involve breeding in captivity. Also suggested are maintaining deep-freeze DNA repositories and seed banks. USARK endorses "caging standards, sound husbandry, escape prevention protocols, and an integrated approach to vital conservation issues."

USARK also outlines Best Management Practices for reptile shows, public health, and public safety.

References

External links
Official website

Herpetology organizations
Non-profit organizations based in North Carolina